Hawks Nest is a mountain in Sullivan County, New York. It is located northeast of Long Eddy. Cherry Ridge is located north-northwest and Sam Miller Hill is located northeast of Hawks Nest.

References

Mountains of Sullivan County, New York
Mountains of New York (state)